Sunbury was an electoral district in New Brunswick. It was abolished in 1973 as New Brunswick moved from bloc voting to a single-member first past the post system. It was dissolved into the new ridings of Sunbury and Oromocto.

Members of the Legislative Assembly

Election results

References

Former provincial electoral districts of New Brunswick
1973 disestablishments in New Brunswick
Constituencies disestablished in 1973
1785 establishments in North America